Christopher Koch is an American director of film and television.

He is known for directing the films Snow Day (2000), his feature directorial debut, and A Guy Thing (2003).

Koch's television credits include The Adventures of Pete & Pete, Malcolm in the Middle, Scrubs, My Name Is Earl, Better Off Ted, Cougar Town, Workaholics, The Middle, Modern Family, The Neighbors, Young Sheldon, A Million Little Things, American Housewife, Ordinary Joe, Reboot, Young Rock and Not Dead Yet.

In addition, Koch is the co-owner of the production company KONK, which he co-created with film producer David Kerwin.

References

External links

American film directors
American television directors
Living people
Place of birth missing (living people)
Year of birth missing (living people)